Bothwell Browne (born Walter Bothwell Bruhn; 1877–1947) was a Danish American stage and film performer, best known as a female impersonator.

Early life
Born in Copenhagen, Browne grew up in San Francisco  and developed a vaudeville act.  At one point he was performing as a duo with male impersonator Kathleen Clifford.  He was in New York by 1908, when The New York Times reports him as suing Texas Guinan over the rights to a Gibson Girl stage act.

Career
Deliberately or not, Browne competed with the better-known female impersonator Julian Eltinge. Some audiences and theater managers found his act more seductive and therefore more unsettling than Eltinge. Browne's Broadway production Miss Jack opened in September 1911 at the Herald Square Theater, exactly one week before Eltinge's more successful The Fascinating Widow.

Browne's only film appearance is the 1919 Mack Sennett production Yankee Doodle in Berlin, Sennett's highest-budget film up to that point, and a bit of World War I propaganda. This release was parallel to Eltinge's anti-German film Over the Rhine (re-cut into The Isle of Love three years later).

The same year, Browne appeared as the headliner at the Palace Theater in New York, the single most sought-after booking in American vaudeville, in December 1919, supported on stage by the Sennett Bathing Beauties.  This appears to be the pinnacle of his career. He thereafter retired to teach dancing classes in San Francisco, and died in Los Angeles at age 79-80.

See also
Julian Eltinge
Bert Savoy
Karyl Norman

References 

1877 births
1947 deaths
Male actors from Copenhagen
American male silent film actors
American male stage actors
American drag queens
Vaudeville performers
Danish emigrants to the United States
20th-century American male actors
LGBT male actors